Nasser Mahmoud Noor (born 22 August 1996) is a Emirati footballer who plays as a midfielder for UAE Pro League club Ajman.

Personal life
Although born in the United Arab Emirates, he is not an Emirati citizen because of his bidoon condition and has received a Comorian passport instead, despite having no family connections to the East African nation. He is not eligible to play for the Comoros national team, according FIFA eligibility rules.

Career statistics

Club

Notes

References

External links

1996 births
Living people
Stateless people
Emirati footballers
Naturalized citizens of Comoros
Comorian footballers
Association football midfielders
UAE Pro League players
Al-Wasl F.C. players
Ajman Club players